Chicken Soup is an American sitcom starring Jackie Mason and Lynn Redgrave. It aired on ABC from September 12 to November 7, 1989.

Overview
The series focuses on the interfaith relationship of a middle-aged Jewish man, Jackie (Mason), and an Irish Catholic woman, Maddie (Redgrave). Episodes centered around humorous situations and obstacles caused by the couple's different religions.

Controversy and cancellation
Chicken Soup was scheduled after the #1 primetime series Roseanne, but was canceled because it could not hold a large-enough percentage of the audience from its lead-in and because of controversy over inflammatory remarks by Mason during the New York City Mayoral elections.

Cast
 Jackie Mason as Jackie Fisher
 Lynn Redgrave  as Maddie Peerce
 Johnny Pinto as Donnie Peerce  
 Alisan Porter as Molly Peerce 
 Kathryn Erbe as Patricia Reece
 Brandon Maggart as Mike Donovan
 Rita Karin as Bea Fisher
 Cathy Lind Hayes as Barbara Donovan

Episodes

References

External links
 Chicken Soup @ Carsey-Werner
 Carsey-Werner - Chicken Soup
  

1989 American television series debuts
1989 American television series endings
1980s American sitcoms
American Broadcasting Company original programming
English-language television shows
Religious comedy television series
Television series about Jews and Judaism
Television series by Carsey-Werner Productions
Television shows set in New York City